The James W. Edie House is a historic house at Jackson and Washington Streets in Judsonia, Arkansas.  It is a two-story wood-frame structure, with a side gable roof, weatherboard siding, and a stone pier foundation.  A cross gable section projects from the center of the front facade, with a single-story porch spanning its width.  It is supported by wooden columns with capitals at the top, and has decorative jigsawn balustrades and brackets.  Built in 1883, it is one of White County's few surviving 19th-century houses.

The house was listed on the National Register of Historic Places in 1991.

See also
National Register of Historic Places listings in White County, Arkansas

References

Houses on the National Register of Historic Places in Arkansas
Houses completed in 1883
Houses in White County, Arkansas
National Register of Historic Places in White County, Arkansas
Judsonia, Arkansas
1883 establishments in Arkansas